Mike Jarno Maria te Wierik (born 8 June 1992) is a Dutch professional footballer who plays as a centre-back for Emmen.

Club career

Early career
Te Wierik started his career with Heracles Almelo. He scored his first professional goal in a memorable 3–3 draw with Ajax on 20 October 2012.

FC Groningen 
He moved to FC Groningen in 2017, signing a three-year deal. In 2018, he became the captain at the Euroborg.  He scored his first goal for the club in a 3-3 draw against PSV on the 13th of December 2017.

Derby County
On 6 February 2020 it was announced that te Wierik had signed a pre-contract agreement to join Derby County in the summer of 2020 when his contract with FC Groningen expires. Te Wierik agreed a three-year deal which will run until the summer of 2023. Upon signing with the club, Derby County boss Phillip Cocu described him as "a good defender and a leader, which is demonstrated by the fact he is FC Groningen’s captain, and he will be a very good signing for us.” Te Wierik made his Derby debut in an EFL cup penalty-victory over Barrow Town and his league debut in a 0-2 defeat to Reading. He was later dropped from the first team, with Derby boss Cocu explaining the decision because te Wierik needed some time to "get used" to Championship football. After the sacking of Cocu, te Wierik failed to make a match day squad under new interim manager Wayne Rooney, being behind a number of other players for first-team places.

Ahead of the reopening of the January 2021 transfer window it was reported that te Wieirk had been told he was free to find another club. Te Wierik was linked with five clubs in the January 2021 transfer window, with four Dutch clubs (former club FC Groningen, Fortuna Sittard, FC Utrecht and Heracles Almelo) and German 2. Bundesliga side FC St. Pauli expressing an interest. Te Wierik agreed a deal to return to FC Groningen and, when discussing his time at Derby, admitted that he had not played well enough.

Return to Groningen
On 19 January 2021, he rejoined Groningen, signing a three-and-a-half year deal. Te Wierik started his first game for them against Vitesse in a 1-0 away defeat on the 23rd of January 2021.

Emmen
On 1 February 2023, te Wierik signed a two-and-a-half-year conract with Emmen.

International career
Te Wierik represented the Netherlands at under-20 and under-21 youth levels in 2013-14.

Career statistics

References

1992 births
People from Hof van Twente
Footballers from Overijssel
Living people
Dutch footballers
Netherlands under-21 international footballers
Netherlands youth international footballers
Association football defenders
Heracles Almelo players
FC Groningen players
Eredivisie players
English Football League players
Derby County F.C. players
FC Emmen players
Dutch expatriate footballers
Expatriate footballers in England
Dutch expatriate sportspeople in England